Miroslava was one of the daughters of tsar Samuil of Bulgaria and Agatha. Princess Miroslava fell in love with the Byzantine noble captive Ashot Taronites, who was of Armenian origin, and threatened to commit suicide if she was not allowed to marry him. Samuel conceded and appointed Ashot governor of Dyrrhachium.

Later Ashot made contact with the local Byzantines and the influential John Chryselios, Samuel's father-in-law. Ashot and Miroslava boarded one of the Byzantine ships that were beleaguering the town and fled to Constantinople, where the Emperor Basil II granted Ashot the title of magistros and Miroslava, the title of zoste patrikia (lady-in-waiting).

Sources

10th-century births
11th-century deaths
10th-century Bulgarian people
11th-century Bulgarian people
10th-century Bulgarian women
11th-century Bulgarian women
Bulgarian princesses
Bulgarian people of Armenian descent
11th-century Byzantine people
11th-century Byzantine women
Cometopuli dynasty
Ladies-in-waiting

Daughters of emperors